Robbie Horgan (born 7 June 1968) is an Irish former professional footballer who played as a goalkeeper.

Career
Born in Dublin, Horgan started his career at Shamrock Rovers, making his League of Ireland debut on 14 April 1987. He was the last goalkeeper to play for Shamrock Rovers at Glenmalure Park (Milltown) in a game that decided the League of Ireland B Division title in 1987.

He then moved to Drogheda United in 1988 making his debut on 4 September in a 2–1 home win over Bray Wanderers. He kept 12 clean sheets in 26 league games as Drogheda won the League of Ireland First Division title in 1989. In the 1990/1991 season Horgan kept 15 clean sheets as Drogheda again won the First Division.

After four and a half years at United Park he then moved to Shelbourne in November 1992. He then signed back for Rovers in July 1994 where he spent another eight years. Horgan played in 2 European games for Shamrock Rovers against Djurgårdens IF in the 2002–03 UEFA Cup.

He made his last League of Ireland appearance in the last game of the 2007 League of Ireland season.

Horgan was the goalkeeping coach at Sporting Fingal until they went out of business. Horgan made history in August 2009 when he became the only player to have played at Milltown and Tallaght Stadium.

He went to Drogheda United in February 2011, as an assistant to Mick Cooke. Drogheda won the League of Ireland Cup in 2012.

Cooke left Drogheda in November 2013 and Horgan was confirmed as his replacement shortly afterwards.

Honours

As a Player 
League of Ireland First Division: 2
 Drogheda United 1988/89, 1990/91
Leinster Senior Cup (football)
 Shamrock Rovers 1997

As a Coach 
League of Ireland Cup: 
 Drogheda United 2012

Sources
Irish Football Handbook by Dave Galvin & Gerry Desmond

References

1968 births
Living people
Association footballers from County Dublin
Association football goalkeepers
Republic of Ireland association footballers
Shamrock Rovers F.C. players
Drogheda United F.C. players
Shelbourne F.C. players
Dublin City F.C. players
Monaghan United F.C. players
St Patrick's Athletic F.C. players
League of Ireland players